Marriage Strike (German: Ehestreik) is a 1930 German silent comedy film directed by Carl Boese and starring Livio Pavanelli, Maria Paudler and Georg Alexander.

The film's sets were designed by the art director August Rinaldi. It was made at the tail-end of silent film production, as sound film was rapidly taking over.

Cast
Livio Pavanelli as Doctor Fritz Denk  
Maria Paudler as Mary  
Georg Alexander as Doctor Edgar Hupp  
Julius Falkenstein as Professor Haberling  
Hanni Weisse as Lucy  
Gerhard Dammann

References

External links

1930 comedy films
German comedy films
Films of the Weimar Republic
Films directed by Carl Boese
German silent feature films
German black-and-white films
Silent comedy films
1930s German films